Pathum Nissanka Silva (born 18 May 1998) is a professional Sri Lankan cricketer who plays for Sri Lanka in all three formats of the game. He made his international debut for the Sri Lanka cricket team in March 2021 and currently slotted as the permanent opening batsman.

Early and domestic career
Pathum Nissanka was born on 18 May 1998 in Galle. His father Sunil Silva worked as a ground boy and his income was low. Pathum's mother sold flowers near the Kalutara temple. In early childhood, he was raised in a poor family background. Started his cricket career during his time at Kalutara Vidyalaya. When in the School Cricket Championship he scored unbeaten double century (205) off 190 balls against President's College, Rajagiriya at Colts ground, Colombo. He made his List A debut for Hambantota District in the 2016–17 Districts One Day Tournament on 17 March 2017. He made his Twenty20 debut for Badureliya Sports Club in the 2017–18 SLC Twenty20 Tournament on 24 February 2018.

In March 2018, he was named in Kandy's squad for the 2017–18 Super Four Provincial Tournament. The following month, he was also named in Kandy's squad for the 2018 Super Provincial One Day Tournament.

In March 2019, he was named in Kandy's squad for the 2019 Super Provincial One Day Tournament. In August 2021, he was named in the SLC Greens team for the 2021 SLC Invitational T20 League tournament. In November 2021, he was selected to play for the Colombo Stars following the players' draft for the 2021 Lanka Premier League. In July 2022, he was signed by the Kandy Falcons to play in the 2022 Lanka Premier League tournament.

International career
In January 2019, he was named in Sri Lanka A's squad for the first-class series against Ireland A. He was the leading run-scorer for Sri Lanka A with 258 runs in two matches. In February 2019, he scored his 1,000th run in the 2018–19 Premier League Tournament, batting for Nondescripts Cricket Club against Colombo Cricket Club. He finished the tournament as the leading run-scorer for Nondescripts Cricket Club, with 1,088 runs in seven matches.

In November 2019, he was named in Sri Lanka's squad for the 2019 ACC Emerging Teams Asia Cup in Bangladesh. Later the same month, he was named in Sri Lanka's squad for the men's cricket tournament at the 2019 South Asian Games. The Sri Lanka team won the silver medal, after they lost to Bangladesh by seven wickets in the final.

In February 2021, Nissanka was named in Sri Lanka's limited overs squad for their series against the West Indies. He made his Twenty20 International (T20I) debut for Sri Lanka on 3 March 2021, against the West Indies. Three days later, Nissanka was named in Sri Lanka's Test squad, also for their series against the West Indies. He made his One Day International (ODI) debut for Sri Lanka on 10 March 2021, against the West Indies. He made his Test debut for Sri Lanka on 21 March 2021, against the West Indies. In the second innings of the match, he scored 103 runs to become the fourth batsman for Sri Lanka to score a century on debut in Test cricket. It was also the first century to be scored by a Sri Lankan batsman away from home on debut.

On 1 October 2021, he was added to Sri Lanka's squad for the 2021 ICC Men's T20 World Cup. During the World Cup, Nissanka scored 221 runs in eight matches, including three half centuries. On 16 January 2022, against Zimbabwe Nissanka scored his maiden ODI half century. He scored 146 runs in three matches, including two half centuries. Due to his performance, Nissanka was named the Player of the Series. Even though Sri Lanka lost the T20I series 4-1 against Australia in February 2022, Nissaka broke the record of the Sri Lankan batsman who scored the most runs in a T20I match series against Australia, scoring 184 runs in the 5 matches.

In June 2022, in the third match against Australia, Nissanka scored his first century in an ODI match, with 137 runs, as Sri Lanka beat Australia by six wickets. During the Test series against Australia, Nissanka contracted COVID-19 and was ruled out of the series. During the T20I series against Australia, he reached 598 T20I runs broke the Sri Lankan record for the Most runs in the first 20 T20I innings for Sri Lanka held by Kumar Sangakkara with 576 runs. In the meantime, he surpassed Tillakaratne Dilshan's record for the Most 30+ scores for Sri Lanka in first 20 T20I innings with by reaching eleven 30+ scores.

During the 2022 Asia Cup, Nissanka played as the opener with Kusal Mendis and they made match-winning partnerships in the games against Bangladesh, Afghanistan and India. Meanwhile, Nissanka made half centuries against India and Pakistan in the Super 4 stage. Chasing 174 against India, Nissanka and Mendis made 97 runs within 11 overs and set up the chase. Even though Nissaka got out early in the final against Pakistan, Sri Lanka finally won the tournament for the sixth time.

First round in T20I World cup 2022, against UAE, Nissanka scored his 8th T20I half century. He scored 74 runs in 60 ball to out Sri Lanka descendant total of 152 runs. Due to excellent bowling performance from Sri Lanka they won the match by 79 runs and Nissanka won player of the match award for his performance.

On 5 November 2022, against England, Nissanka scored 9th T20I half century. He scored 67 runs from 45 deliveries hitting two boundaries and five sixes. Despite his knock Sri Lanka lose the match by 4 wickets.

References

External links

1998 births
Living people
Sri Lankan cricketers
Sri Lanka Test cricketers
Sri Lanka One Day International cricketers
Sri Lanka Twenty20 International cricketers
Badureliya Sports Club cricketers
Hambantota District cricketers
Kalutara Physical Culture Centre cricketers
Nondescripts Cricket Club cricketers
Colombo Stars cricketers
Cricketers from Galle
South Asian Games silver medalists for Sri Lanka
South Asian Games medalists in cricket
Alumni of Isipathana College
Sinhalese sportspeople
Cricketers who made a century on Test debut